Maxixcatl was the tlatoani (ruler) of the Nahua altepetl (city-state) of Ocotelolco at the time of the Spanish conquest of the Aztec Empire.

Ocotelolco was one of the four towns that formed the state of Tlaxcallan. Mase Ecasi gave his daughter, baptized as Dona Luisa, to Juan Velazquez de Leon, both of whom were killed on La Noche Triste.  Maxixcatzin was instrumental in forming the alliance between Tlaxcallan and the Spanish force of Hernán Cortés against the Aztecs.  Maxixcatl died in the smallpox epidemic which decimated the indigenous population of central Mexico in 1520.

He was succeeded by his 13-year-old son Lorenzo Maxixcatl.

See also
Spanish conquest of the Aztec Empire
Xicotencatl II
Xicotencatl the Elder

References

Further reading
Hassig, Ross (2001) "Xicotencatl: rethinking an indigenous Mexican hero", Estudios de Cultura Nahuatl, UNAM (Estudios de Cultura Nahuatl).

16th-century deaths
Tlaxcaltec nobility
Year of birth unknown

Nobility of the Americas